Parañaque, officially the City of Parañaque, is a first class highly urbanized city in the National Capital Region of the Philippines. According to the 2020 census, it has a population of 689,992 people.

It is bordered to the north by Pasay, to the northeast by Taguig, to the southeast by Muntinlupa, to the southwest by Las Piñas, and to the west by Manila Bay. Like the rest of Metro Manila, Parañaque experiences a tropical climate with only two distinct seasons, wet (July to September) and dry (October to June).

It is also the home of the Parañaque Integrated Terminal Exchange public transport and the Aseana City business district development which includes Ayala Malls Manila Bay.

Etymology
Several myths exist as to how Parañaque got its name. One story holds that long ago, a balete (banyan) tree that looked like a majestic ship stood at the mouth of what is now called the Parañaque River. It earned the name Palanyag, taken from the term "palayag", which means “point of navigation”.

Another folktale says that before the Spaniards arrived, there were natives who lived close to Manila Bay, and their occupation was fishing (pangingisdâ). Their neighbours to the east in modern Muntinlupa were farmers and called "tagá-palayán" ("of the rice paddies"). One day, the fishermen and rice farmers held a feast, and were drunk from tubâ (coconut toddy). One farmer suggested they name the whole place "Palayán" as a sign of cooperation and goodwill between them. A fisherman protested, saying they should name it "Palalayag" instead. As a compromise, they agreed to merge the two words and came up with "Palalanyag". Another drunken guest shouted, “Mabuhay ang Palanyag at ang mga tagá-Palanyag!” ("Long live Palanyag and those of Palanyag!") The rest liked this word better, and the place was called "Palanyag".

A third myth tells that Spanish soldiers in a horse-drawn carriage asked to be taken to a certain place. When they arrived, one of the soldiers ordered, "¡Para aquí! ¡Para aquí!" (“Stop here! Stop here!”), which the coachman did not understand. The soldier repeated it and later, the coachman left the carriage and told others “These Spaniards are repeatedly saying "para aniya ake...para aniya ake” to the laughter of the crowd. The story spread, and the term "Para Aniya Ake" stuck.

Historical Account
"On the coast near Manila are Laguo (i.e. Lagyo), Malahat, Longalo, Palañac, Vakol, Minacaya, and Cavite. All these villages are in the neighborhood of Cavite, and belong to His Majesty, to whom they pay tribute."

– Miguel de Loarca, Relación de Yslas Filipinas (1582)Historically speaking, the earliest Spanish records (de Loarca's Relación etc.) listed the settlement as "Palañac", which indicates that by at least the late 16th century, the place's name was something akin to "Palanyag".

History

Early history
Due to their proximity to the sea, the early Parañaqueños traded with the Chinese, Japanese, Indonesians, Indians, and Malays. Traditional occupations and trades included saltmaking, fishing, planting rice, shoemaking, slipper-making and weaving.

Spanish Period
Parañaque was officially founded in the year 1580 by Order of Saint Augustine and it was Fray Diego de Espiñar, O.S.A. who became the first minister of the town. The Council of the Definitors (a conference of chiefs of the religious orders) held on June 11, 1580 (Conquistas delas Islas of Fray Gaspar San Agustin, O.S.A.) accepted the village of Palanyag, as Parañaque, as an independent pueblo. Other towns in the islands which simultaneously established on the same date according to the 1580 chapter of the Augustinians were Malolos (in Bulacan), Bulacabe (on Panay) and Bantayan (in Cebu). The image of Palanyag's patroness, Nuestra Señora del Buen Suceso de Palanyag, was brought to Saint Andrew's Parish in La Huerta on August 10, 1625. Nuestra Señora del Buen Suceso de Palanyag is the third oldest Marian Image in the Philippines.

Early Spanish census dated 1591 to 1593 also mentioned Longalo and Parañaque as two villages along Manila Bay composed of some 800 tribute-payers. Politically, Don Galo and Parañaque were then under the Encomienda and Provincia de Tondo. The community was headed by cabezas de barangay, a westernized version of datus (chieftains), and the principalía (Hispanicised local nobility), who together justified and moderated the demands of the Spanish colonizers. Education was limited to the principalía as they were the only ones who could afford it.

Historical accounts state that the town's strategic location enabled the townspeople to play an important role in Philippine history. Palanyag was located at the crossroads of Manila, between the provinces of Cavite and Batangas. In 1574, during the invasion of the town by the Chinese pirate Limahong, Parañaquenos, particularly those from Don Galo, heroically aided in preventing the attack on Manila. This incident became known as the "Red Sea Incident" due to the blood that flowed through the sacrifice of the people of barrio Santa Monica. With the arrival of Spanish forces led by Captain Juan de Salcedo from Ilocos, Limahong was finally repulsed, and the occupation of the town was averted.

When the British invaded Manila in 1762, the townspeople once again remained loyal to the Spanish colonizers, especially the Augustinians. The invasion however showed that the Spaniards was not invincible and that their rule was not to be permanent. More than a hundred years later, this would prove to be true. During the Philippine Revolution of 1896–1898, the Spaniards realized that the town was a practical gateway to Cavite, the bastion of the revolutionary Katipuneros. Conversely, the Katipuneros based in Cavite saw the town as their gateway to Intramuros, the Spanish seat of government in Manila. Prominent Paraqueños such as Manuel Quiogue and secular priest Father Pedro Dandan y Masangkay became leading revolutionary figures.

American Period
During the American Period of the Philippines, Parañaque became part of the newly established province of Rizal in 1901. The municipality was previously part of the province of Manila, which was disestablished on the same year.

On October 12, 1903, Las Piñas was merged to become part of Parañaque. However, it was later separated on March 27, 1907, to become an independent town once again.

World War II

On January 1, 1942, Parañaque was one of the towns of Rizal that was merged with Manila and Quezon City to form the City of Greater Manila. During the Japanese occupation of the Philippines in World War II, Parañaque supplied leadership to guerilla movements such as the Hunters ROTC, as well as food and arms. Parañaque was one of the first towns to be liberated and its guerillas helped pave the way for the combined American and Philippine Commonwealth forces to enter the south of Manila. As can be gleaned from the above, Parañaque has played and continues to play a strategic role in the Philippines' political and economic progress, as shown by the quick recovery the town shown following the damage it incurred during the long Battle of Manila in 1945. The City of Greater Manila was disestablished effective August 1, 1945.

Cityhood

On November 7, 1975, Parañaque was separated from Rizal and became part of Metropolitan Manila or the National Capital Region by virtue of Presidential Decree No. 824.

Parañaque was later converted as the eleventh city of Metro Manila on February 15, 1998, and was chartered and urbanized through President Fidel V. Ramos during the celebration of the city's 418th Founding Anniversary. Joey Marquez became its first city mayor.

Contemporary history
Owing to Parañaque's strategic location, it is an important center for trade and business in Metro Manila. Baclaran, where a large number of dry goods stores are located, is one of the busiest markets in the country. Small fishing villages called “fisherman's wharves” are also situated alongside Barangay La Huerta, where the famous DAMPA, a seaside market with numerous restaurants serving fresh seafood, is found. This has the country's international airport and the Duty Free Philippines for imported goods. and of course Ang Bagong Nayong Pilipino Entertainment City where three integrated resorts (IR) licensed by PAGCOR - Philippine Amusement & Gaming Corporation are located. On October 9, 2018, the Parañaque Integrated Terminal Exchange was officially opened in Parañaque City, and is the first landport in the Philippines.

Geography 

Parañaque is situated in the southern portion of Metro Manila. It is subdivided into two distinct districts, each of which contains eight barangays. District I comprises Baclaran, Tambo, Don Galo, Santo Niño, La Huerta, San Dionisio, Vitalez and San Isidro, while the District II consists of Barangays BF, San Antonio, Marcelo Green, Sun Valley, Don Bosco, Moonwalk, Merville and San Martin de Porres.

Districts and barangays

Parañaque is politically subdivided into 16 barangays.

Climate

Demographics

Language
The native languages of Parañaque are Tagalog and Spanish, Parañaque being the natal place of the great Filipino writer Manuel Bernabé, but the majority of the residents can understand and speak English, and the use and knowledge of Spanish in Parañaque is now almost non-existent.

Religion
Most of Parañaque's population are Christians, mainly Roman Catholic.

Roman Catholic churches in Parañaque are under the jurisdiction of the Diocese of Parañaque. There are two National Shrines, the National Shrine of Our Mother of Perpetual Help (commonly known as the Baclaran Church or Redemptorist Church) and the National Shrine of Mary Help of Christians; the Parañaque Cathedral or the Cathedral Parish of St. Andrew is the oldest church in Parañaque and the mother church of the Diocese of Parañaque. There are about 90 parishes and 2 sub-parishes. El Shaddai, a Catholic charismatic renewal movement, is centered in the city.

Born Again Evangelical Christian Churches Christ Commission Fellowship BF Parañaque, Greenhills Christian Fellowship Sucat, Jesus Is Lord Church Worldwide Parañaque, Word International Ministries, Victory Christian Fellowship Parañaque, Citygate Christian Ministries, South Gate Baptist Church are also located in this city.

The Greek Orthodox Church (from which the icon of the Perpetual Help originated) also has a cathedral in United Paranaque V - the Annunciation of the Theotokos Orthodox Cathedral - the first Orthodox church in Southeast Asia consecrated by the Ecumenical Patriarch of Constantinople. [16]

Other Christian denominations include the Church of Jesus Christ of Latter-day Saints , Iglesia ni Cristo and Members Church of God International. There are also a number of non-Catholic (mostly Protestant) churches in Parañaque.

There is also a minority of Muslims, primarily living on Baclaran. There are two mosques in Parañaque.

Economy

Shopping centers

Parañaque also relies on shopping centers as part of its economy. The principal malls include SM City Sucat (opened in July 2001), SM City Bicutan (opened in 2002), and SM City BF Parañaque (opened in 2016), all owned and operated by SM Supermalls of SM Prime Holdings. Ayala Malls Manila Bay, owned and operated by Ayala Malls, started its operation on September 26, 2019. Robinsons operates one mall inside BF Homes and one supermarket. There are also smaller malls like Jaka Plaza, Pergola Lifestyle Mall, Aseana Square Mall, and Noah's Place Mall. Walter Mart has two malls of its franchise inside Parañaque. Duty-Free Fiesta Mall is also located in Parañaque. Baclaran functions as the city's flea market, primarily selling clothing, especially school uniforms and costumes.

Hotel and Gambling

Hotels and gambling also form part of Parañaque's economy. Integrated resorts Solaire Resort & Casino, City of Dreams Manila and Okada Manila attract foreign tourists. Closed in 2014, Casino Filipino once served as a casino in the city until the opening of Ang Bagong Nayon Pilipino or Entertainment City, in parts of barangays Tambo and Don Galo. Cockfighting is also common in the barangays. The Roligon Mega-Cockpit, found in Tambo, is considered as the largest and most modern cockpit in Asia.

Government

Parañaque is composed of two congressional districts and two legislative districts which are further subdivided into 16 Barangays. 1st District consists of eight barangays in the western half of the city, whilst 2nd District consists of eight barangays in the eastern part of the city.

Mayors of Parañaque

Culture

Festivals

Parañaque is famous for its lively festivals, such as the Caracol, a festival that revolves around boats.

The Sunduan Festival is a tradition in the city that depicts the act of a man fetching the object of his affection from the woman's home to bring her to church or the town plaza. Both festivals are held around February 13–15 for the cityhood of Parañaque's anniversary.

The city stages the cenaculo, a reenactment of the passion of Christ, during Holy Week, the Pasko ng Pagkabuhay during Easter, and the Santacruzan, a procession reenacting the search of the True Cross of Christ, in May. Shortly thereafter, the colorful Flores de Mayo, a festival commemorating the discovery of the cross by Queen Elena (mother of St. Constantine) is held.

An outstanding feature of this historic town by the bay is the cultivation of its cultural traditions such as the komedya and bati-bati, among others, that continue to attract local and foreign tourists alike, especially during the summer months.

Parañaque is known for sabong, a form of cockfighting constrained in coliseums.

Sports
Parañaque is also the home of Olivarez Coliseum located inside the Olivarez College in Sucat, Parañaque where they hosted the Parañaque City Patriots of the MPBL.

Transportation

Railway
Parañaque is served by the LRT-1 (via Baclaran station which is located in Pasay) and the PNR (via Bicutan station). The LRT-1 is to be extended to Bacoor. The actual construction officially started on May 7, 2019, because the right-of-way was cleared from obstructions. The actual construction will start from Baclaran to Sucat. The groundbreaking of LRT Line 1 South Extension Project was held on May 4, 2017. Once it becomes operational, Parañaque will be served by the LRT-1 (via Redemptorist, Manila International Airport, Asia World, Ninoy Aquino, and Dr. Santos). The extension is slated for partial operations by late 2024 or early 2025 and full operations by second quarter of 2027.

Airport

Parañaque is the location of Terminal 1 of Ninoy Aquino International Airport as the airport complex sits on the Pasay-Parañaque border. It is located along Ninoy Aquino Avenue and many major international airlines operate flights from the terminal.

Land

Road network 

Parañaque is served by a network of expressways and arterial roads.

Expressways, like Skyway, South Luzon Expressway (Skyway At-Grade), and Manila-Cavite Expressway (CAVITEX), connect the city with the rest of Metro Manila and Calabarzon. The at-grade portion of Skyway in Parañaque has two service roads, namely the West Service Road and East Service Road, which both serves the communities and businesses lying near the expressway. The NAIA Expressway is an elevated airport expressway that connects Ninoy Aquino International Airport, CAVITEX, Skyway and Entertainment City. The section of C-5 Southlink Expressway from Santo Niño to CAVITEX is under construction and will directly connect Circumferential Road 5 (C-5) with CAVITEX.

Dr. Santos Avenue (formerly Sucat Road), Roxas Boulevard, Doña Soledad Avenue and Quirino Avenue function as the city's principal arterial roads. Carlos P. Garcia Avenue (C-5 South Extension), which has been involved in land ownership controversies involving then-Senator Manny Villar, serves as secondary arterial roads.

BF Homes Parañaque is served also by a network of arterial roads, serving residential and commercial areas within it.

Public utility vehicles 
Similar to other cities in Metro Manila, public utility vehicles (PUV) such as buses, jeepneys and UV Express ply throughout Parañaque to serve commuters. The Paranaque Integrated Terminal Exchange (PITx) serves as an intermodal transport hub for PUVs. PITx is also planned to connect with the future Asia World LRT-1 station.

Education

Parañaque has a diverse educational system with specializations in various academic and technical fields and is home to many schools and colleges such as PATTS College of Aeronautics which focuses on producing students specialized in the realm of Aviation around the world, Olivarez College, the only school accredited with both the Philippine Accrediting Association of Schools, Colleges and Universities (PAASCU) and the Philippine Association of Colleges and Universities - Commission on Accreditation (PACUCOA) which specializes in Health-Related Sciences such as Nursing, Radiologic Technology, Physical Therapy, and Midwifery, Parañaque Science High School ( ranked the second best school for providing quality education to high school students. It scored an 89.64 average on the National Achievement Test for the school year 2013–2014), St. Andrew's School (oldest private school in Parañaque, established 1917), St. Paul College of Paranaque, Manresa School, Sacred Heart School and Ann Arbor Learning Center amongst many others.

Notable personalities

Teresita de Castro - 24th Chief Justice of the Supreme Court of the Philippines
Mary Michelle De Guzman - Miss Paranaque 2018
Most Rev. Francisco De Leon - Bishop of Antipolo, former Parish Priest of Holy Eucharist Parish 
Freddie Webb - actor, comedian, radio host, former PBA player and former Senator
Edwin Olivarez - politician
Leila de Lima - former Senator and former Secretary of the Philippine Department of Justice
Karen Davila - broadcaster, TV host, reporter
Ted Failon - broadcaster, TV host, Radio host
Henry Omaga-Diaz - broadcaster, TV host, reporter
Dolphy -  actor, TV host, comedian
Gina Pareño - actress
Andrew E. - rapper, TV host, comedian, endorser
Geoff Eigenmann - actor, TV host, former MYX VJ, endorser
Gerphil Flores - singer
Enrique Gil - actor, dancer, model, TV host, endorser
Princess Velasco - singer, TV host
Bianca Gonzalez-Intal - TV host, Pinoy Big Brother: Celebrity Edition third celebrity placer
Max Eigenmann - actress, singer and model
Phoemela Barranda - model, host, actress, endorser, former Pinoy Fear Factor contestant 
Ken Chan - actor, singer, TV host, photographer 
Rita De Guzman - actress, singer, TV host
Bianca Manalo - Binibining Pilipinas-Universe 2009, actress, TV host, endorser
Val Sotto - actor, comedian, former City Councilor
Joey Marquez - actor, comedian, TV host, Former Vice Mayor, Former Mayor, endorser
Alma Moreno - actress, TV host, dancer, Councilor (1st District)
Roselle Nava - singer, actress, TV host, Councilor (1st District)
Loisa Andalio - ex-PBB Housemate, actress, TV host
Japs Sergio -former bassist/vocals of Rivermaya
Gian Magdangal - singer, TV host, actor
AJ Perez - blogger, motivational speaker
Sam Pinto - actress, model, TV host, former PBB Housemate
Stef Prescott - actress, TV host, StarStruck Batch 4 Avenger Alumni
Sue Ramirez - actress, TV host, model, endorser
Khalil Ramos - singer, actor, TV host, endorser
Ram Revilla - actor
Biboy Rivera - bowler
Medwin Marfil - lead band singer of True Faith
Mariel Rodriguez-Padilla - actress, TV host, former MTV VJ, endorser
Bianca Umali - actress, endorser, TV host
Dimples Romana - actress, TV host
Jake Roxas - actor, endorser
RJ Padilla - actor & Former PBB Housemate
Gabbi Garcia - actress, TV host, endorser
Aiah Arceta - singer, rapper, actress, member of P Pop Girl Group Bini
Lloyd Cadena - YouTube Vlogger, radio DJ, comedian
Dominic Ochoa - actor, comedian, TV Host
Korina Sanchez-Roxas - broadcaster, TV host
Pinky Webb - broadcaster, TV host, reporter
Jason Webb - former basketball player, sportscaster and Councilor (1st District), current Purefoods Star Hotshots coach, sports commentator
Andrea Abaya - ex PBB Housemate, TV host, actress, model, endorser, 
Anjo Yllana - actor, comedian, TV host, former Councilor and former Vice Mayor
Wendell Ramos - actor, TV host, comedian, endorser
Sheldon Gellada - Bassist of the Hale Band
Jondan Salvador - PBA Basketball Player for Barako Bull
Reynante Jamili - former Filipino Boxer
 Richard Hwan - ex PBB Housemate & Model
 JC de Vera - actor, TV host, endorser
 Ricky Davao - actor, director 
 Therese Malvar - actress, TV host
 Yam Concepcion - model, actress, dancer
 Jomari Yllana - actor, Councilor (1st District)
 Andi Manzano - TV host, radio host, model, former MTV VJ
 Christian Vasquez - actor, model, former PBB Celebrity Housemate 
 Michael Christian Martinez - Filipino figure skater who represented the Philippines at the 2014 Winter Olympics and the 2018 Winter Olympics.
Lincoln Cortez Velasquez (Cong TV) - vlogger
Fred Payawan - actor
 Vandolph - actor, comedian, Councilor (1st District)

Sister cities

Local
 Cebu City, Cebu
 Panabo, Davao del Norte
 Tagum, Davao del Norte
 Iloilo City, Iloilo
 Malabon, Metro Manila
 Las Piñas, Metro Manila
 Pasay, Metro Manila
 Navotas, Metro Manila
 Tangub, Misamis Occidental
 Bacolod, Negros Occidental

Foreign
 Haeundae District, Busan, South Korea
 Carson, California, United States

See also
Roman Catholic Diocese of Parañaque
Nuestra Señora del Buen Suceso de Palanyag
Parañaque Cathedral
Parañaque River

References

External links

 
 [ Philippine Standard Geographic Code]

 
Cities in Metro Manila
Populated places on Manila Bay
Populated places established in 1572
1572 establishments in the Philippines
Highly urbanized cities in the Philippines